John Anthony Howkins (born 3 August 1945) is a   British author and   speaker on   Creative Industries,   particularly the development of this economic sector in China. He is visiting professor, University of Lincoln, England, and vice dean and visiting professor, Shanghai School of Creativity, Shanghai Theater Academy, China.

Education
Howkins was awarded a BA in International Relations at Keele University and a Diploma in Urban Design at the Architectural Association School of Architecture.

Career
Howkins' media career spans TV, film, digital media, publishing and consulting with companies including HandMade plc, Hotbed Media, HBO and, from 1982 to 1996, Time Warner. He is a former chairman of the London Film School and is a former Executive Director of the International Institute of Communications, an independent, non-profit membership organization that focusses on critical policy and regulatory issues in the telecom and media. He was Executive Director of the International Institute of Communications, with members in over 100 countries, from 1985 to 1990. He was the Conference Coordinator of the European Audiovisual Conference, co-hosted by the European Commission and the UK Government, in 1998.

In 2006 he became chairman of the John Howkins Research Centre on the Creative Economy, launched by the Shanghai Municipal Government at the Shanghai School of Creativity, Shanghai Theatre Academy. He is an adviser to the Shanghai Creative Industries Association and the Shanghai Creative Industry Centre. Since 2007 he has chaired BOP Consulting, an independent research and strategy consultancy who maximise the potential of culture, media and creativity, in parallel with his independent consulting work.

He also worked as a journalist for many years on Frendz, Time Out, The Sunday Times, Harpers & Queen and The Economist. He was editor of InterMediate, Vision (the BAFTA journal) and The National Electronics Review.

He has a BA in International Relations (Keele University) and a AA (Dip) and MA in Urban Design (Architectural Association).

Books
 Understanding Television, Sundial Books (1976) 
 Communications in China, Prentice Hall Press (5 July 1982) 
 New Technologies, New Policies, BFI Publishing (17 June 1982) 
 The Creative Economy: How People Make Money from Ideas, Penguin Global (1 June 2002) 
 Creative Ecologies: Where Thinking is a Proper Job, Transaction Publishers (1 April 2010)

The Creative Economy: How People Make Money From Ideas
The original, essential book on the creative economy, first published in 2001 and updated in 2007 and 2013. Covers the nature of creativity, how to be creative, business models, intellectual property, managing a creative company, the 22 largest sectors, online opportunities, creative capital and more.

References

Sources
 John Howkins Creative Economy website
 Debrett's

External link

Living people
1945 births
Alumni of Keele University